The Learned is an epithet which may refer to:

 Arngrímur Jónsson (1568–1648), Icelandic scholar and apologist
 Coloman, King of Hungary (c. 1070–1116), also called the Book-Lover and the Bookish
 Ferdinand VI of Spain (1713–1759), King of Spain
 Jacob I the Learned, Catholicos of the Armenian Apostolic Church between 1268 and 1286
 Maurice, Landgrave of Hesse-Kassel (1572–1632), a landgrave in the Holy Roman Empire
 Sæmundr fróði (1056–1133), Icelandic priest and scholar

See also
 List of people known as the Wise

Lists of people by epithet